The olive-streaked flycatcher (Mionectes olivaceus) is a species of bird in the family Tyrannidae.

It is found in Panama and Costa Rica.

Its natural habitats are subtropical or tropical moist lowland forests, subtropical or tropical moist montane forests, and heavily degraded former forest.

References

Mionectes
Birds of Panama
Birds of Costa Rica
Birds described in 1868